The 1892–93 Football League season, was the fifth season of Football League. This season saw the introduction of the Second Division.

Final league tables
The tables below are reproduced here in the exact form that they can be found at the Rec.Sport.Soccer Statistics Foundation website and in Rothmans Book of Football League Records 1888–89 to 1978–79, with home and away statistics separated.

Beginning with the season 1894–95, clubs finishing level on points were separated according to goal average (goals scored divided by goals conceded).  The goal average system was eventually scrapped beginning with the 1976–77 season. Since the goal average was used for this purpose for such a long time, it is presented in the tables below even for the seasons prior to 1894–95.

During the first five seasons of the league, that is until the season 1893–94 re-election process concerned the clubs which finished in the bottom four of the league.

First Division

Results

Maps

Second Division

New clubs in the league (all except Darwen)

Results

Maps

Test matches
The test matches were neutral-venue play-offs between the bottom 3 First Division teams and the top 3 Second Division teams. The First Division teams, if coming out as winners, would retain their places in the division. If a Second Division team won, it would be considered for First Division membership through an election process. Losing Second Division teams would stay in the Second Division.

Сonsequences
Of the winners, Darwen and Sheffield United were elected into the First Division, while Newton Heath (later known as Manchester United F.C.) remained in the First Division.

Of the losers Small Heath (later known as Birmingham City F.C.) and Notts County continued in the Second Division, while Accrington resigned from the league altogether.

See also

1892–93 in English football
1892 in association football

References

External links

Ian Laschke: Rothmans Book of Football League Records 1888–89 to 1978–79. Macdonald and Jane’s, London & Sydney, 1980.

1892-93
1